John Flynn Private Hospital is an acute care facility in the southern Gold Coast suburb of Tugun. The 345 bed hospital provides services to people of southern Gold Coast and parts of the Northern Rivers region of New South Wales.

Originally opened as the Moran Hospital of Excellence with the Moran Clinic.  The hospital was not successful and was left abandoned by 1991.  The hospital was revived by 1993 and renamed John Flynn who was responsible in 1928 for the first outback medical services which became known as the Flying Doctor Service.

John Flynn Hospital complex consists of the main hospital building, specialist medical suites, the John Flynn Cancer Centre, and the hospital also has an onsite 24-hour pharmacy.

Facility services 
 Anaesthesiology
 Bariatric
 Cardiac Services
 Chemotherapy
 Dental Surgery
 Dermatology
 Ear, Nose and Throat
 24-hour Emergency Department
 Endo  Alpha Theatre
 Endocrinology
 Gastroenterology
 General Surgery
 Gynaecology
 Gynaecology Oncology
 Haematology
 Internal Medicine
 IVF Service
 John Flynn Cancer Centre
 MRI
 Neurology
 Obstetrics
 Ophthalmology
 Oral and Maxillofacial
 Orthopaedic Surgery
 Paediatrics
 Pathology
 Plastic Surgery
 Radiation Oncology 
 Radiation Therapy
 Radiography
 Radiology / Imaging
 Rehabilitation
 Renal Dialysis
 Respiratory Medicine
 Robotic Surgery
 Sleep Disorders
 Urodynamics
 Urology
 Vascular Surgery

Location 
John Flynn Private Hospital is located on 42 Inland Drive, Tugun.

References 
About John Flynn Private Hospital
Clinical Services Overview
Location
[ Inland Dr at John Flynn Hospital, Tugun | TransLink]
Rudolph, Ivan. John Flynn: of flying doctors and frontier faith. Central Queensland University Press, 2000.

1993 establishments in Australia
Hospitals established in 1993
Hospitals in Queensland
Buildings and structures on the Gold Coast, Queensland
Private hospitals in Australia